April Rosemary Cantelo (born 2 April 1928) is an English soprano.

Life and career 
Cantelo was born in Purbrook, Hampshire in 1928. She attended Chelmsford County High School for Girls.  She studied in London under Vilém Tauský, Joan Cross, Imogen Holst and others.  She sang in the Glyndebourne Chorus and then made her debut in Edinburgh in 1950 as Barbarina and Echo. She played Rosetta in Love in a Village, the pasticcio by Arne, at Aldeburgh in June 1952. In the first half of the 1950s she sang Barbarina, Countess Ceprano and Poussette at Covent Garden.

Cantelo sang in the British premieres of Hans Werner Henze's Boulevard Solitude (Manon Lescaut) and Kurt Weill's Rise and Fall of the City of Mahagonny (Jenny).  She appeared in the world premiere of Malcolm Williamson's English Eccentrics. Among the roles she created are:
 Lady in The Grace of Todd (Gordon Crosse)
 Susan in Dinner Engagement (Lennox Berkeley)
 Orpah in Ruth (Berkeley)
 Helena in A Midsummer Night's Dream (Benjamin Britten)
 Berthe in The Violins of Saint-Jacques (Williamson)
 Beatrice Weston in Our Man in Havana (Williamson)
 Swallow in The Happy Prince (Williamson)
 Ann in Julius Caesar Jones (Williamson)
 Semele in Semele (John Eccles).

April Cantelo made several appearances at the Henry Wood Proms between 1958 and 1973, singing in Carmina Burana, Vaughan Williams Pastoral Symphony, Berlioz Les nuits d'été, (under Basil Cameron), Malcolm Williamson's Our Man in Havana (vocal suite), Purcell's The Indian Queen, Cavalli's Messa concertata, excerpts from Monteverdi operas, Purcell odes and Haydn's Mass in D minor 'Nelsonmesse'.

Cantelo took part in the inaugural concert of the Purcell Room in London on 3 March 1967 ('Homage to Henry Purcell') with Robert Tear, Raymond Leppard and Bernard Richards.

She directed a production of Henry Purcell's The Fairy-Queen in New Zealand in 1972.

In 1974 Cantelo sang Xantippe in the first professional UK production of Telemann's Der geduldige Socrates, for Kent Opera.

Grove describes her voice as "a pure, clear lyrical soprano, not large, but capable of flexibility and variety of expression", describing her as "a very gifted singing actress". Her private pupils included Rosemary Joshua.

April Cantelo married the conductor Colin Davis in 1949.  They had two children, Suzanne and Christopher.  The marriage was dissolved in 1964 after he fell in love with their au pair Ashraf Naini, a young Persian woman who was visiting London at the time, and who became his second wife.

Recordings
Cantelo recorded widely. Among baroque works, she recorded Charpentier's Messe de minuit pour noël with the Choir of King's College, Cambridge under David Willcocks (on EMI), Handel's Messiah conducted by Walter Susskind (Pye Golden Guinea), Purcell The Indian Queen under Charles Mackerras (L’oiseau-Lyre), Purcell's Hail! Bright Cecilia (Ode for St Cecilia's Day 1692), conducted by Michael Tippett (Vanguard), and Handel and Blow anthems (Argo) as well as Handel's Ode for St. Cecilia's Day conducted by David Willcocks (Argo). In 1967 with the same conductor, he recorded for Emi records Ltd, with the Choir of King's College, Cambridge and the English Chamber Orchestra, the Charpentier's Messe de Minuit for Christmas H.9. in 1969. She recorded one solo recital program of 14 songs from the eighteenth century by various composers all using lyrics by Shakespeare with Raymond Leppard conducting the English Chamber Orchestra (L’oiseau-Lyre). She plays Servilia in the English-language performance of Mozart's The Mercy of Titus under John Pritchard, deputising for the indisposed Jennifer Vyvyan (Nimbus Prima Voce).

As well as three Haydn Masses with St. John’s College, Cambridge forces and the Academy of St Martin in the Fields under George Guest (on Argo), nineteenth century works included Schubert part songs (Argo), Donizetti's Emilia di Liverpool (Candida and Bettina) with Sutherland (BBC/Myto), Berlioz Béatrice et Bénédict (Héro) and mélodies (Philips), Sullivan's Iolanthe (Celia) under Sargent (HMV), and Solveig songs in Grieg's Peer Gynt with the Royal Philharmonic Orchestra under Alexander Gibson (World Record Club).

Her 20th century recordings include excerpts from Ariadne auf Naxos by Strauss under Beecham from Edinburgh in 1950 (Beecham Society WSA), Britten's The Little Sweep (Juliet) and Albert Herring (Miss Wordsworth) under the composer (Decca), Williamson's Julius Caesar Jones (Argo) and his The Happy Prince (Swallow) (Argo) and vocal works by Williamson and Hugh Wood (Argo).

BBC studio recordings of Die Feen (Ada) and Das Liebesverbot (Isabella) by Richard Wagner have subsequently been issued commercially on DG.

She also recorded the well-loved Holly and the Ivy LP with Alfred Deller and the Deller Consort.

The sound track recording of the film The Music Lovers (recorded 1969) includes Cantelo singing part of the letter scene from Eugene Onegin, with the LSO conducted by André Previn (United Artists) and she had previously recorded Metamorphosis on a Bed-time Theme by Alistair Sampson and Joseph Horovitz at the 1958 Hoffnung Festival, and Horrortorio (Dracula's daughter) at the 1961 Hoffnung Festival.

References

External links

1928 births
English operatic sopranos
Living people
People from Purbrook
20th-century British women opera singers
Musicians from Hampshire